

Lady of Enghien
This is a list of the counts of Enghien. In 1394 Enghien goes to John of Luxembourg, Sire of Beauvois, husband of Marguerite d'Enghien. In 1482 Enghien goes to Francis, Count of Vendôme, husband of Marie of Luxembourg and thus the house of Bourbon-Condé.

–1092 : Engelbert I
1092– : Engelbert II, son
–1190 : Huwes I, son
1190–1192 : Engelbert III, son
1192–1242 : Engelbert IV, son
1242–1256 : Sohier I, son
1256–1271 : Walter I, the great, son
1271–1310 : Walter II, son
1310–1345 : Walter III, son
1345–1364 : Sohier II, son
1364–1381 : Walter IV, son
1381–1394 : Louis, nephew

Countess of Enghien

Duchess of Enghien
Also known as the Duchess of Montmorency

See also
Duchess of Bourbon
Duchess of Guise
Princess of Condé
Duchess of Montmorency

External links
HAINAUT:SEIGNEURS d'ENGHIEN

 
Enghien, consorts
Enghien
Enghien
Enghien, consorts